Benjamin Lo-Pinto (born March 11, 1976) is a Seychellois former swimmer, who specialized in backstroke events. Lo-Pinto has collected two medals from the All-Africa Games, and later represented Seychelles at the 2000 Summer Olympics, where he became the nation's flag bearer in the opening ceremony.

Lo-Pinto established his swimming history for Seychelles at the 1999 All-Africa Games in Johannesburg, South Africa, where he earned a silver medal in the 100 m backstroke (59.64), and bronze in the 200 m backstroke (2:11.21). Because of his stellar performance during the Games, he was named the Sportsman of the Year by the Seychelles Olympic and Commonwealth Games Association.

At the 2000 Summer Olympics in Sydney, Lo-Pinto competed only in the men's 100 m backstroke. He achieved a FINA B-cut of 58.66 from the All-Africa Games. Swimming from start to finish in heat one, he raced to the second seed in 58.66, nearly a full second behind leader Alexandru Ivlev of Moldova. Lo-Pinto failed to advance into the semifinals, as he placed forty-seventh overall in the prelims.

References

1976 births
Living people
Seychellois male swimmers
Olympic swimmers of Seychelles
Swimmers at the 2000 Summer Olympics
Male backstroke swimmers
People from Greater Victoria, Seychelles
African Games silver medalists for Seychelles
African Games medalists in swimming
African Games bronze medalists for Seychelles
Competitors at the 1999 All-Africa Games
20th-century Seychellois people
21st-century Seychellois people